Jorsale  is a small village in the Khumbu region of Nepal. It lies in the west side of the Dudh Kosi river,  just north of Monjo and south of Namche Bazaar, at an altitude of 2,740 m,

The trail start at Lukla and Jorsale is the last settlement before Namche, the main stopping point for trekkers on their way to Sagarmartha (Mount Everest), one of the UNESCO  World Heritage Site since 1979, via the Gokyo Ri route or Tengboche route.

Its primary function of the village is to support the tourism industry and as such consists of a number of guesthouses and a bakery.

See also 
 Everest Base Camp

References

Populated places in Solukhumbu District